Šilai is the name for a number of settlements in Lithuania. It may refer to:
 Šilai, Akmenė District Municipality
 Šilai, Skiemonys, Anykščiai District Municipality
 Šilai, Viešintos, Anykščiai District Municipality
 Šilai, Biržai District Municipality
 Šilai, Jonava District Municipality
 Šilai, Pakruojis District Municipality
 Šilai, Jonava District Municipality
 Šilai, Krekenava, Panevėžys District Municipality
 Šilai, Panevėžys District Municipality – town
 Šilai, Raguva, Panevėžys District Municipality
 Šilai, Šaukotas, Radviliškis District Municipality
 Šilai, Šiaulėnai, Radviliški District Municipality
 Šilai, Raseiniai District Municipality
 Šilai, Rokiškis District Municipality
 Šilai, Šilalė District Municipality
 Šilai, Šilutė District Municipality
 Šilai, Luokė, Telšiai District Municipality
 Šilai, Žarėnai, Telšiai District Municipality
 Šilai, Zarasai District Municipality